The Chinese Figure Skating Championships is a senior-level figure skating national championship held by the Chinese Figure Skating Association to determine the Chinese national champions. Skaters compete in the disciplines of men's singles, ladies' singles, pair skating, and ice dancing.

Senior medalists

Men

Ladies

Pair skating

Ice dancing

Team event

See also
 Chinese National Junior Figure Skating Championships (Junior level)
 Chinese National Novice Figure Skating Championships (Novice level)

References

External links
 Chinese Figure Skating official website

 
Figure skating national championships
Figure skating in China
Figure skating